Tisgaon is a city in Ahmednagar district, Nashik Division, Maharashtra state, India. The city is known for its 30 historical gates, which are a major tourist attraction. Places of religious importance in the area include Mohata Devi temple, 24 km distance; Sevalal Maharaj temple; and Chaitanya Kanifnath temple in Madhi, 4 km distance

Tisgaon has an average elevation of 533 meters (1748 feet). The local language is Marathi.

Cities and towns in Ahmednagar district